Richard Norton Smith (born October 2, 1953) is an American historian and author, specializing in U.S. presidents and other political figures. In the past, he worked as a freelance writer for The Washington Post, and worked with U.S. Senators Edward Brooke and Bob Dole.

Early life and education
Born in Leominster, Massachusetts, in 1953, Smith graduated magna cum laude from Harvard University in 1975 with a degree in government. Following graduation he worked as a White House intern and as a freelance writer for The Washington Post. 
He became a speech-writer for Massachusetts Senator Edward Brooke, and then Senator Bob Dole, with whom he collaborated on numerous projects over the years.

Career

Smith's first major book, Thomas E. Dewey and His Times, was a finalist for the 1983 Pulitzer Prize. He has also written An Uncommon Man: The Triumph of Herbert Hoover (1984); The Harvard Century: The Making of a University to a Nation (1986); and Patriarch: George Washington and the New American Nation (1993). His 1997 biography of Robert R. McCormick, The Colonel: The Life and Legend of Robert R. McCormick received the Goldsmith Book Prize awarded by Harvard University's John F. Kennedy School of Government in 1998.

Between 1987 and 2001, Smith served as director of the Herbert Hoover Presidential Library and Museum in West Branch, Iowa; the Dwight D. Eisenhower Center in Abilene, Kansas; the Ronald Reagan Presidential Library, the Ronald Reagan Presidential Foundation and the Reagan Center for Public Affairs in Simi Valley, California; and the Gerald R. Ford Museum and Library in Grand Rapids and Ann Arbor, Michigan.

In December 2001, Smith became director of the Robert J. Dole Institute of Politics at the University of Kansas in Lawrence. There he supervised construction of the Institute's permanent home and launched a Presidential Lecture Series and other programs. In October, 2003 he was appointed the first Executive Director of the Abraham Lincoln Presidential Library and Museum, a four-building complex in Springfield, Illinois.

In 2009, Smith was invited by the US Congress to be one of two historians addressing it on the two-hundredth anniversary of Abraham Lincoln's birth. Earlier, he delivered a eulogy at Gerald Ford's Michigan funeral, a role he repeated at Betty Ford's request when she was buried beside her husband in 2011.

In 2014 Smith published On His Own Terms: A life of Nelson Rockefeller. Smith took 14 years to write the book and said that he spent about $250,000 of his own money on the project. In an interview with C-SPAN, he said that Random House provided an advance of $50,000 for the book.

Smith is currently at work on a biography of President Ford. In 2001 Mr. Smith created Presidents and Patriots History Tours.  Twice a year he leads historical tours emphasizing American presidents and history seldom found in the text books.

Works
Thomas E. Dewey and His Times. Simon & Schuster, 1982. 
Uncommon Man: The Triumph of Herbert Hoover. High Plains Publishing, 1990. 
Patriarch: George Washington and the New American Nation. Houghton Mifflin, 1993. .
The Colonel: The Life and Legend of Robert R. McCormick. Northwestern University Press, 2003. .
On His Own Terms: A Life of Nelson Rockefeller. Random House Publishing Group, 2014. .

References

External links
Richard Norton Smith - Official Website

Presidents and Patriots Tours, by Richard Norton Smith - Official Website

1953 births
Living people
People from Leominster, Massachusetts
21st-century American historians
21st-century American male writers
Harvard University alumni
Historians from Massachusetts
American male non-fiction writers